Kaugel may refer to:
Kaugel River
Kaugel language